This is a list of universities in Haiti.

Universities/Schools
This is a list of post-secondary colleges and universities in Haiti.

 Institut des Sciences des Technologies et des Etudes Avancées d'Haiti (ISTEAH)

References

Universities
Haiti
Haiti